Ircila is a monotypic moth genus in the family Castniidae described by Constant Vincent Houlbert in 1918. Its single species, Ircila hecacte, was first described by Gottlieb August Wilhelm Herrich-Schäffer in 1854. It is known from Haiti.

References

Castniidae